The women's 3 metre springboard, also reported as 3-metre springboard diving, was one of four diving events on the Diving at the 1960 Summer Olympics programme.

The competition was split into three phases:

Preliminary round (26 August)
Divers performed four voluntary dives without limit of degrees of difficulty. The sixteen divers with the highest scores advanced to the semi-finals.
Semi-final (27 August)
Divers performed three voluntary dives without limit of degrees of difficulty. The eight divers with the highest combined scores from the preliminary round and semi-final advanced to the final.
Final (27 August)
Divers performed three voluntary dives without limit of degrees of difficulty. The final ranking was determined by the combined score from all three rounds.

Results

Notes

References
  
 

Women
1960
1960 in women's diving
Div